The Dobloug Prize is a literature prize awarded for Swedish and Norwegian fiction. The prize is named after Norwegian businessman and philanthropist Birger Dobloug (1881–1944) pursuant to his bequest. The prize sum is 4 * 150,000 Swedish crowns (2011). The Dobloug Prize is awarded annually  by the Swedish Academy.

Prize winners
List of winners, source:

References 

Swedish literary awards 
Norwegian literary awards
Awards established in 1951
1951 establishments in Sweden